Saint Vassa was a 4th-century Christian martyr from Edessa in Greek Macedonia. She and her three children were tortured to death. She is venerated on August 21, by the Greek Orthodox Church and Serbian Orthodox Church. A Maronite synaxarium was dedicated to her.

References

External links

4th-century Christian martyrs
Torture victims